Network Norwich is the brand name given to First Norfolk & Suffolk bus services in and around the city of Norwich. First launched in September 2012, the network now consists of nine colour-coded lines extending across Norwich city centre, outer suburbs, and surrounding towns and villages across Norfolk and into Suffolk.

History
The network was launched on 23 September 2012, with the rebranding of several First Norfolk & Suffolk bus routes within the Norwich city area as colour-coded lines. The Charcoal Line was added most recently, being launched to Bungay in Suffolk in May 2017.

The network began with the repainting of existing buses into Network Norwich livery, a variant of FirstGroup's national corporate Olympia scheme, "dipped" with colour-coded front ends; these buses included Dennis Tridents and Volvo B7TLs with Plaxton President bodywork, Volvo B9TLs with Wright Eclipse Gemini 2 bodywork, and Volvo B7Ls and Volvo B7RLEs with Wright Eclipse bodywork.

The first brand new buses for the network, eight 10.8-metre, 37-seater Wright StreetLite DF single-deckers, were delivered in November and December 2014. Eleven longer-wheelbase 41-seater Wright StreetLite Max single-deckers were delivered for the Green Line in November 2015, followed by nine Wright StreetDeck double-deckers for the Pink Line in April 2016.

The Yellow Line was extended to Fakenham in north Norfolk on 3 April 2018, as First took over service X29 from Stagecoach, who ceased all operations in the area. On 3 September 2018, the Purple Line was extended with the launch of route 36A to Harleston. From 7 January 2019, the Charcoal Line was extended with First taking over routes 40A and 41A from Konectbus.

Core network

Pink Line – 10 / 10A / 11 / 11A / 12 / 12A

The Pink Line consists of services 10, 10A, 11, 11A, 12 and 12A. The 11, 11A, 12 and 12A start at Norfolk and Norwich University Hospital to the south of the city and run northwards through Cringleford, Eaton, Norwich city centre, Sprowston where the 11 and 11A terminate, with the 12 and 12A terminating in Wroxham. The 10 and 10A begin at Eaton Park and Cringleford respectively and both run via the city centre to Mousehold Heath.

The routes serve City College Norwich, Anglia Square shopping centre, Sprowston Tesco, Sprowston Manor, the quays along the River Bure in Hoveton and Wroxham, Hoveton & Wroxham railway station and the Bure Valley Railway.

The Pink Line operates every ten minutes during daytimes from Monday to Saturday, reducing to half-hourly on Sundays and bank holidays and hourly during evenings. In April 2016, the Pink Line was upgraded, receiving nine brand new Wright StreetDeck Double Deck Buses featuring free WiFi on board and e-leather seats. The 10 and 10A routes are served by Alexander Dennis Enviro200s and Dennis Dart MPDs due to narrow streets along the route.

Turquoise Line – 13 / 13A / 13B / X13

The Turquoise Line consists of services 13, 13A, 13B and X13, which all follow a broadly similar route. The routes start at Attleborough and runs northwards through Wymondham, Hethersett, Norwich city centre and Old Catton, terminating at Spixworth.

The routes serve Attleborough Academy, Wymondham town centre, Wymondham Leisure Centre, Gateway 11, Norfolk and Norwich University Hospital and Anglia Square shopping centre.

The 13 operates up to every thirty minutes during daytimes from Monday to Saturday, being replaced by the 13A and 13B which operate hourly during evenings and on Sundays and bank holidays. Initially operated solely using Volvo B9TL/Wright Eclipse Gemini 2 Double Deck Buses, a number of Dennis Trident/Plaxton President and Volvo B7TL/Plaxton President have been repainted into Turquoise Line livery to provide additional capacity.

Green Line – 14 / 14A / 14B / 15 / 15A / 15B

The Green Line consists of services 14, 15 and 15A. Beginning at Wymondham Cross, the routes head east through Hethersett, Norwich city centre, Dussindale where the 14 terminates, Brundall, Blofield, Lingwood where the 15A terminates and Acle where the 15 terminates.

The routes serve Wymondham Leisure Centre, Hethersett Academy, Norwich railway station, Broadland Business Park, Brundall railway station, Lingwood railway station, Acle railway station.

The Green Line operates every fifteen minutes between Wymondham and Yarmouth Road during daytimes from Monday to Saturday, every thirty minutes between Norwich city centre, Dussindale and Brundall, and every hour between Brundall, Lingwood and Acle. On Sundays and bank holidays, frequencies along all parts of the route are every hour. The service was upgraded in November and December 2015, receiving eleven Wright StreetLite Max Single Deck Buses to operate the service.

Orange Line – 21 / 21A / 22 / 22A

The Orange Line consists of routes 21, 21A, 22 and 22A. The 21 and 21A start at the Norfolk and Norwich University Hospital, whilst the 22 and 22A start at the University of East Anglia, before the routes join together and run east through Bowthorpe and West Earlham to Norwich city centre, before turning north and all terminating in Old Catton at White Woman Lane.

The routes serve the University of East Anglia, Norwich Research Park, the Norfolk and Norwich University Hospital, Three Score, Chapel Break, Bowthorpe Shopping Centre, Clover Hill, West Earlham shops, Bowthorpe Road, Dereham Road, Anglia Square shopping centre and Old Catton.

Between Old Catton, the city centre and Bowthorpe, the routes operate every 15 minutes during daytimes Monday to Saturday and up to every 30 minutes during evenings on these days. Between Bowthorpe and the university or hospital, the routes operate every 30 minutes at all times. 21 & 21A services operate hourly on Sundays combining to make an every 30 minute frequency, there is no Sunday service on the 22 and 22A routes to the university.

The route is served by seven Dennis Tridents with Plaxton President bodies.

Red Line – 23 / 23A / 23B / 24 / 24A

The Red Line operates up to every 7 minutes along Dereham Road and Plumstead Road during daytimes from Monday to Saturday, reducing to every 30 minutes in the evenings. From Queen's Hills or Costessey to the city centre, and from Heartsease or Thorpe St. Andrew to the city centre, the Red Line operates every 15 minutes during daytimes from Monday to Saturday, every 20 minutes on Sundays and bank holidays and every 30 minutes during evenings. The service is operated using Volvo B9TL/Wright Eclipse Gemini 2 Double Deck Buses & Volvo B7RLE/Wright Eclipse Urban Single Deck Buses

Blue Line – 25 / 26 / 26A

The Blue Line consists of services 25, 26 and 26A. Which link the University of East Anglia with the Norfolk and Norwich University Hospital, Norwich City Centre and Norwich Railway Station.

The services take the following routes, the 25 starts at UEA and runs via Eaton Park and Unthank Road to the City Centre before continuing to Norwich Railway Station, via Riverside Retail Park.
Routes 26 & 26A start at either Norfolk and Norwich University Hospital or UEA (26 Daytimes), they both then serve UEA Main Bus Stop on their way to the City Centre, via Earlham Road and Northfields (26A only), they continue to Norwich Railway Station via Riverside Retail Park.

The Blue Line operates up to every 7 minutes during Monday to Saturday daytimes between the university and the city centre, reducing to every 10 minutes on Sundays and bank holidays, every 15 minutes during evenings and every hour overnight after midnight. Between the university and the hospital, the service operates every 30 minutes at all times. The service is operated using Volvo B9TL/Wright Eclipse Gemini 2 Double Deck Buses. Unlike other refurbished buses of this type, the interior retains blue grab rails and the original seat cover design. The only other line to share this trait is the Turquoise Line.

Yellow Line – 28 / 29 / X29

The Yellow Line consists of services 28, 29 & X29. The X29 starts in Fakenham, running mainly along the A1067 road through Guist, Twyford, Bintree, Foxley, Bawdeswell, Lenwade and Attlebridge. The 28 starts in Thorpe Marriott and the 29 starts in Taverham; the 28, 29 and X29 all join together in Taverham, running along the Drayton High Road through Drayton into Norwich city centre, where all three terminate.

The routes serve Fakenham Market Place, Pensthorpe Natural Park, Bawdeswell Garden Centre, the Dinosaur Park at Lenwade, Taverham High School, Hinks Meadow, Hellesdon Hospital, Sweet Briar Retail Park and Anglia Square shopping centre.

Between Fakenham and Norwich city centre, the Yellow Line operates every hour during daytimes from Monday to Saturday (with additional buses during the morning and evening peaks), reducing to every two hours on Sundays and bank holidays. The Monday to Saturday daytime frequency increases to every 30 minutes between Thorpe Marriott and the city centre, and every 15 minutes between Taverham and the city centre. Service is provided using Volvo B7RLE/Wright Eclipse Urban Single Deck Buses and Volvo B9TL/Wright Eclipse Gemini 2 Double Deck Buses.

On 3 April 2018, First Norfolk & Suffolk took over service X29 from Stagecoach in Norfolk as a result of Stagecoach ceasing operations in the area. A number of Volvo B9TL/Wright Eclipse Gemini 2 Double Deck Buses have been transferred from First West Yorkshire to cover for the increase in buses required on the Yellow Line, the first of which entered service in new Yellow Line livery on 27 March 2018. The Yellow fronted Plaxton President bodied Volvo B7TLs that were operating on the Yellow Line were withdrawn when these units were transferred. These now carry the lilac-fronted livery, and provide extra capacity on all lines, including the Yellow Line.

Purple Line – 36 / 37 / 37B / 38 / 38A / 39 / 39A

The Purple Line consists of services 36, 37, 37B, 38, 38A, 39 & 39a. The 37 and 37B start at Mulbarton, the 38 starts at Long Stratton and the 38A starts at Harleston, all to the south of Norwich. The routes run northwards through Lakenham, where they are joined by the 39 and 39A, and then into Norwich city centre, where they are joined by the 36, and the 37B terminates. The routes run through Norwich city centre and out to Mile Cross where the 39 and 39A terminate, Ives Road where the 38 terminates, Hellesdon where the 37 terminates and Horsford, where the 36 terminates.

The routes serve Tasburgh, Newton Flotman, Swainsthorpe, Dunston Hall Hotel, Swardeston, Lakenham Homebase and Sainsbury's, Anglia Square shopping centre, the Dixons Centre, Hellesdon Library and Norwich Airport.

From Monday to Saturday daytimes, the Purple Line operates every 10 minutes along Aylsham Road, every 15 minutes between Hellesdon and the city centre, every 20 minutes between Mile Cross and Lakenham, and every 30 minutes out to Horsford, Mulbarton and Long Stratton. On Sundays and bank holidays, the frequency decreases to every 30 minutes on all routes. The Purple Line is operated using Dennis Trident/Plaxton President, Volvo B7TL/Plaxton President Double Deck Buses and Volvo B7RLE/Wright Eclipse Urban Single Deck Buses.

The Purple Line was extended on 3 September 2018 with the introduction of new route 38A to Harleston.

Charcoal Line – 40 / 40A / 41 / 41A / X41

The Charcoal Line (coloured dark grey) consists of services 40, 41 and X41. Starting in Norwich city centre, the routes run southeastwards through Bracondale, Trowse, Poringland where the 40 terminates, Brooke, Kirstead and Ditchingham, with the 41 and X41 terminating at Bungay in Suffolk.

The route serves City College Norwich, the County Hall at Trowse, Framingham Earl High School, the Nightingale Centre, Bigod's Castle, Bungay Library and the swimming baths in Bungay.

Services operate up to every 15 minutes between Poringland and Norwich city centre from Monday to Saturday daytimes, and up to every hour between Bungay and Norwich city centre, with additional buses provided during the morning and evening peaks. The Charcoal Line is operated using a mixture of Volvo B9TL/Wright Eclipse Gemini 2 Double Deck Buses and a fleet of Wright StreetLite DFs purchased brand new in November 2014.

From 7 January 2019, the Charcoal Line will be extended with the addition of routes 40A and 41A, which Network Norwich are taking over from Konectbus.

Other services

Excel

Norwich bus station is a major hub of the Excel bus network operated by First Norfolk & Suffolk, which provides services between Peterborough in Cambridgeshire and Lowestoft in Suffolk. The bus station provides the main interchange point between the western excel route between Peterborough, Wisbech, King's Lynn, Swaffham, Dereham and Norwich, and the eastern X1 route between Norwich, Acle, Great Yarmouth, Gorleston-on-Sea and Lowestoft; originally these 2 routes operated as 1 service (X1), but was split in into the 2 routes above in July 2014, for operational reasons, until February 2018 these both operated as X1, but Norwich To Peterborough was renamed excel to stop confusion between the routes.

Additionally, Norwich provides a hub for various Excel-branded feeder services which serve locations along the eastern X1 corridor, including the X2, X21 and X22 from Norwich to Lowestoft via Gillingham, Beccles, Worlingham, Carlton Colville, North Cove, and Whitton; and the X11 from Norwich to Belton via Acle, Great Yarmouth, Gorleston-on-Sea and the James Paget University Hospital.

Unbranded routes

Several additional routes are operated by Network Norwich without branding applied, usually as they are infrequent services. Service 30 operates between Norwich city centre, Taverham and Thorpe Marriott, serving the Dixons Centre, Hellesdon Hospital, Sweet Briar Retail Park and Taverham High School.

Fleet
As of June 2017, the Network Norwich fleet consists of 118 buses. This can be broken down into 32 Plaxton President-bodied Dennis Tridents; 21 Wright Eclipse Gemini 2-bodied Volvo B9TLs; 11 Wright StreetLite Maxs; 10 Wright Eclipse Metro-bodied Volvo B7Ls; nine Wright StreetDecks; eight Plaxton President-bodied Volvo B7TLs; eight Wright StreetLite DFs; five Wright Eclipse Urban-bodied Volvo B7RLEs; one Alexander ALX400 bodied Volvo B7TL; two Wright Renown-bodied Volvo B10BLE driver training buses; and two Plaxton Paragon-bodied Volvo B12M driver training coaches.

The Network Norwich fleet is maintained at a single depot, located on Roundtree Way on the Heartsease Estate. A second, smaller facility, located on Vulcan Road, provides additional capacity.

Heritage buses

As of March 2018, Network Norwich had two vehicles painted in retro liveries based on those of the former Eastern Counties bus company, from which Network Norwich (and, by extension, First Norfolk & Suffolk) can trace their history. Both vehicles were Volvo B7L single-deckers with Wright Eclipse Metro bodywork, built in 2002 and originally delivered new to First York and most recently in service with First South Yorkshire before being transferred to Norwich to be repainted into their retro liveries, these have since been scrapped. Recently, a third vehicle has been repainted in a heritage livery. A Volvo B7RLE with Wright Eclipse Urban bodywork, numbered 66985, received the same livery as 60916. In September 2020, another vehicle was transferred to Norwich in a heritage livery from its time in Sheffield; it wears the colours for the Mainline operator.

References

External links
Website

Bus routes in England
Transport in Norfolk
Transport in Suffolk
2012 establishments in England